KIT may refer to:

Educational institutes
 Kanazawa Institute of Technology, Japan
 Kanpur Institute of Technology, Uttar Pradesh, India
 Karlsruhe Institute of Technology, Germany
 Koninklijk Instituut voor de Tropen or Royal Tropical Institute, Dutch institute for intercultural knowledge 
 Kyoto Institute of Technology, Japan
 Kumoh National Institute of Technology, South Korea

US radio stations
 KIT (AM), serving Yakima, Washington
 KMGW (FM), serving Naches, Washington, KIT-FM 2012-2015
 KATS, serving Yakima, Washington, KIT-FM 1968-1979

Other uses
 Kernel for Intelligent Communication Terminals, for the German Bildschirmtext videotex system
 Kingston Interactive Television
 KIT (gene), encoding tyrosine-protein kinase KIT
 KIT, the National Rail code for Kintbury railway station in the county of Berkshire, UK
 Kunst im Tunnel, contemporary art museum, Düsseldorf, Germany

See also
 
 
 KITS, FM radio station
 KITT, TV Knight Rider characters
 Kit (disambiguation)